The Sanjak of İpek or Sanjak of Dukakin was a sanjak (an administrative division of the Ottoman Empire) with its capital in İpek (Peja), now in Kosovo.

Administration
In Fedor Karaczay's 1842 travel memoir, it was reported that the Sanjak of İpek included northeastern Albania and the larger part of the Dukakin plain, and had three kadiluks: Dukakin, İpek, Yakova.

In 1900–1912 the Sanjak of İpek had four kazas: Peja, Gjakova, Gusinje and Berane.

History
Dukakin was firstly the name of an Ottoman kaza (in the Sanjak of Scutari), then in 1520, a sanjak with the name (Dukakin sancak) was established under the Rumelia Eyalet. The name of the sanjak's seat, İpek, was used interchangeably for the sanjak (İpek sancak).

The Sanjak of İpek was often under direct control of the sanjakbey of the Sanjak of Scutari. In 1536 Ali-beg, then a sanjakbey of İpek, was hanged on the orders of the sultan for mistakes and incompetence in governing his sanjak. 
The Christian population of the sanjak often rebelled against the Ottoman authorities, especially in the 1550s, because they were unable to pay the newly implemented taxes. During one of these rebellions the sanjakbey of Dukakin, Kasim-beg, was ordered to suppress the rebellion with help of the sanjaks of Scutari (İşkodra) and Durazzo (Dıraç) if needed. In 1690 the sanjakbey Mahmud Pasha Hasanbegović attacked Austrian troops in Peja during the Great Turkish War.

At the end of 1737, sanjak-bey Mahmudbegović devastated Vasojevići and persecuted a lot of people in the Sanjak of İpek.

Serbs from Peja informed Russia on killings of over 100 people after 1875, as well as looting of the Patriarchate of Peć and Visoki Dečani. In 1877 the sanjak became part of the new Kosovo Vilayet seated in Skopje.

In 1904, the sanjak was abolished.

During the First Balkan War at the end of 1912, the sanjak was occupied by the Kingdom of Montenegro and Kingdom of Serbia. In 1914 a smaller part of the territory became a part of the newly established Principality of Albania, established on the basis of the peace contract signed during the London Conference in 1913.

List of sanjakbeys

Ali Bey (fl. 1536)
Ali-beg (–1537)
Kasim-beg (fl. 1550s)
Mahmud Pasha (fl. 1690)
Tahir Pasha Mahmud Bey-zade (fl. 1717)
Kurd Mehmed Pasha (1727)
Mahmudbegović (fl. 1737).

References

Further reading

Sanjaks of the Ottoman Empire in Europe
Ottoman period in the history of Kosovo
Kosovo vilayet
Sanjak of İpek
1455 establishments in the Ottoman Empire
1913 disestablishments in the Ottoman Empire